The 2018 World Wrestling Clubs Cup – Men's freestyle were held in Babol, Iran on 7–8 December 2018.

Pool stage

Pool A

Pool B

Final

Final ranking

See also 
 2018 Wrestling World Cup - Men's Greco-Roman
 2018 Wrestling World Cup - Men's freestyle

References

clubs, 2018
World Wrestling Clubs Cup
Wrestling
International wrestling competitions hosted by Iran
Sport in Tehran
Wrestling